Kubilay Türkyilmaz (born 4 March 1967) is a Swiss former professional footballer who played as a forward. He completed his international career as the all-time joint leading goal scorer for the Swiss national team, with 34 goals in 64 appearances between 1988 and 2001, equalling the performance of Max Abegglen. Their record was bettered by Alexander Frei in 2008.

Club career
Born in Bellinzona, Ticino, Türkyilmaz began his club career with the local club AC Bellinzona in 1986 and later joined Servette FC in 1989. He left the country in 1990 for the Italian club Bologna FC before joining Galatasaray SK of Turkey, where he won the Süper Lig in his first season, 1993–94, and scored twice against Manchester United in the next season's UEFA Champions League. In 1995, he returned to Switzerland with Grasshopper Zürich, winning the league in 1995–96 and 1997–98.

International career
Türkyilmaz made his international debut on 2 February 1988 against France in Toulouse as a 65th-minute substitute for Hans-Peter Zwicker. Switzerland lost the Tournoi de France match 2–1. His first goals were two against Luxembourg in qualification for the 1990 FIFA World Cup, on 21 September 1988, his seventh match.

He missed the 1994 FIFA World Cup with serious injury, but appeared at Euro 1996, scoring Switzerland's equaliser against England in the opening match of the tournament, a 1–1 draw at Wembley.

His last 8 international matches, from 1997 to 2001, saw him score 14 times, including his first international hat-trick, versus Azerbaijan in qualification for the 1998 FIFA World Cup. He added another hat trick, of three penalty kicks on 7 October 2000 in a 5–1 2002 FIFA World Cup qualifier in Zürich against the Faroe Islands. It was the first hat-trick of its kind in the competition's history. In his final match, on 5 September 2001, he scored twice against Luxembourg away in qualification for the 2002 FIFA World Cup.

Personal life
Türkyilmaz was born in Switzerland to a family of Turkish descent that immigrated from the Yozgat Province; he has said that he would have played for Turkey had they inquired first. He once refused to play for Switzerland in a game against Turkey for fear of being branded a traitor. He now runs a café in his native Bellinzona.

Statistics

International goals
Scores and results list Switzerland's goal tally first

Honours
Galatasaray
 Süper Lig: 1993–94

Grasshoppers
 Nationalliga A: 1995–96, 1997–98

Individual
 Swiss Footballer of the Year: 1995–96, 1996–97, 1997–98

References

External links
 

Living people
1967 births
People from Bellinzona
Association football forwards
Swiss men's footballers
Switzerland international footballers
Swiss expatriate footballers
Expatriate footballers in Italy
Expatriate footballers in Turkey
Swiss expatriate sportspeople in Italy
Swiss expatriate sportspeople in Turkey
Serie A players
Serie B players
Bologna F.C. 1909 players
Brescia Calcio players
Galatasaray S.K. footballers
UEFA Euro 1996 players
Grasshopper Club Zürich players
AC Bellinzona players
FC Luzern players
FC Locarno players
FC Lugano players
Servette FC players
Swiss Super League players
Süper Lig players
Swiss people of Turkish descent
Sportspeople from Ticino